Moinul Islam (born 16 September 1992) is a Bangladeshi cricketer. He made his first-class debut for Khulna Division in the 2017–18 National Cricket League on 22 September 2017. He made his Twenty20 debut for Khelaghar Samaj Kallyan Samity in the 2018–19 Dhaka Premier Division Twenty20 Cricket League on 25 February 2019.

References

External links
 

1992 births
Living people
Bangladeshi cricketers
City Club cricketers
Khulna Division cricketers
Khelaghar Samaj Kallyan Samity cricketers
Place of birth missing (living people)